Afaf (عفاف) is an Arabic language feminine given name.

Notable individuals with the name include:
 Afaf El-Hodhod, born 1996, Egyptian sport shooter
 Afaf Lutfi al-Sayyid-Marsot, born 1933, Egyptian historian
 Afaf Meleis, born 1942, Egyptian nursing professor
 Afaf Zurayk, born 1948, Lebanese artist

In Tunisian Arabic it is transliterated "Afef" and notable individuals with this spelling include:
 Afef Jnifen, born 1963, Tunisian fashion model
 Afef Ben Ismail, born 1994, Tunisian sprint canoeist

Feminine given names
Arabic feminine given names